Émanville may refer to the following communes in France:

Émanville, Eure, in the Eure département
Émanville, Seine-Maritime, in the Seine-Maritime département